Yunqi Zhuhong (1535–1615), also named Zhuhong, was a Chinese Buddhist leader during the Ming Dynasty. He was known as the “Master of Yunqi”, after a monastery restored in his honor. He was born in Hangzhou into a family with the surname Shen. Zhuhong was reportedly an excellent student, although he never succeeded along the path of officialdom. His first connection to Buddhism was that of the Pure Land variety.  After failure in the official examinations he became a monk at thirty-one despite the existence of his second wife, who later became a nun. Zhuhong died at the age of eighty-one. Zhuhong is remembered for his persistent opposition to Roman Catholicism, and for his analysis of the Pure Land tradition of Buddhism. Zhuhong's anti-Catholic writings are a direct rebuttal to the Jesuit Matteo Ricci (利瑪竇).  Along with Yuan Hongdao, Zhuhong wrote extensively on the Pure Land and defended its tradition against other Buddhist critics, as well as analyzing the Pure Land within the larger Buddhist context.

Opposition to Catholicism 

Traditional Buddhist monasticism had declined by Zhuhong's age. The English translation of heshang (和尚) as “monk” by the late Ming is perhaps inappropriate. A better rendition might be “priest” as it is often used in Japan to describe those specialist practitioners of funeral rites and memorial services. Zhuhong himself complained that “Monks are also geomancers, diviners, physiognomists, physicians, gynecologists, potion makers, spirit healers and alchemists. All of the above entail the extreme demise of Buddhism (Sanbi, p. 12b).” The Jesuit entry into sixteenth century China placed them in the middle of such conditions. For Zhuhong and other Buddhists the Jesuits were an additional headache to a long list of serious problems. Zhuhong's rebuttal of Catholicism was the first of a longer and ever-growing response.

At the first stage of anti-Catholicism the Buddhists had a weak grasp of the religion. Zhuhong's Tianshuo (天说, Explanation of Heaven) appeared in his Sanbi collection in 1615. Matteo Ricci's  monumental theological work Tienzhu shiyi (天主實義)　had already appeared in 1596. Zhuhong's polemic coincided with the political appointment of Shen Que (沈隺, d. 1624) as vice minister of rites in Nanking (Nanjing) and his initiation of an anti-Catholic campaign from official circles in 1616. Zhuhong's collected essays, the Zhuzhuang suibi was written and published in three sections, the Chubi (初笔), Erbi (二笔) and the Sanbi (三笔), modeled after the classic Song period collection Rongzhai suibi. Zhuhong's first collection was published in 1600 at age 70, the second and third at age 81 in 1615.

Pure Land Writings 

Zhuhong wrote extensively on the Pure Land Buddhist tradition both to defend it from criticism from other Buddhist institutions (primarily Chan), and to explore and clarify the teachings more.

For example, in his commentary on the Amitabha Sutra, Zhuhong wrote on the phenomenal aspect of the Pure Land, and how at the highest level, the awakened mind sees the Pure Land as it really is.  In so doing, Zhuhong attempted to reconcile the more traditional "Western-direction" view of the Pure Land with the more "mind-only" position frequently espoused by Chan Buddhist institutions.

In addition, in his Dá Jìngtǔ Sìshíbā Wèn (CBETA X.1158), Zhuhong teaches, for example, the importance of the nianfo in establishing a "resonance" with the Buddha Amitabha which leads to a mutual effect that leads to rebirth in the Pure Land.  In additional to a strict, disciplined lifestyle, Zhuhong advocates the verbal form of the nianfo in particular due to the declining Age of the Dharma.

References

General references
 Yu Chun-fang, Renewal of Buddhism in China: Chu-Hung & the Late Ming Synthesis, Columbia University Press, 1981, 
JEFFREY L. BROUGHTON,WITH ELISE YOKO WATANABE,© Oxford University Press 2015
The Chan Whip Anthology:A Companion to Zen Practice.
Chan Whip Yunqi Zhuhong’s 雲棲袾宏 Whip for Spurring
Students Onward through the Chan Barrier
Checkpoints (Changuan cejin 禪關策進;
T.2024.48.1097c10-1109a16)
Anthology of extracts from Chan records dating
from the late Tang dynasty to the Ming dynasty; also
includes extracts from sutras and treatises; many
with Zhuhong's appended comments

Articles 

 Carpenter, Bruce, E. "Buddhism and the Seventeenth Century Anti-Catholic Movement in China", Tezukayama University Review (Tezukayama Daigaku Ronshu), no. 54, 1986, pp. 17–26. 
 Yu Chun-fang in Goodrich and Fang ed., Dictionary of Ming Biography, Columbia University Press, New York, 1976, vol. 1, 322-324. 

Ming dynasty Buddhist monks
1615 deaths
1535 births
Writers from Hangzhou
Chinese spiritual writers
Ming dynasty writers
Buddhist apologists